Joseph Thomas Burton-Gibbs was one of Sydney's "oldest business identities". Born in Derby, England, Burton-Gibbs emigrated to Melbourne in 1853 aboard the ship Indian Queen.  In 1866 he helped establish a printing and publishing house, Clarson, Shallard & Co, with partners Joseph Shallard, Alfred Henry Massina and William Clarson. In 1862 he moved to Sydney to open a branch of the company at 207 Pitt Street. Although the original partnership was dissolved in 1866, Burton-Gibbs continued his partnership with Joseph Shallard, trading as Gibbs, Shallard and Co, which went on to become a leading printer and publisher in the city. One well-known publication was the Illustrated Sydney News. In 1889, he became a founding director of the Imperial Arcade Company Ltd which developed the Imperial Arcade, Sydney.

Burton-Gibbs died on 28 January 1925 at his home "Hillcrest", Church Street, Randwick, and was buried in Rookwood Cemetery.

References

External links 

Year of birth missing
1925 deaths
People from Derby
English emigrants to colonial Australia
Australian publishers (people)